Used Heart for Sale is the debut studio album by American country music singer Gary Allan. It was released on September 24, 1996 via Decca Records Nashville. The album has been certified gold by the RIAA. It produced four singles on the U.S. Billboard Hot Country Songs chart with "Her Man", "Living in a House Full of Love", "From Where I'm Sitting", and "Forever and a Day". "Her Man" reached the Top 10 on the country charts at #7, while none of the other three singles reached Top 40.

Several of the songs on this album are covers, including two its singles. "Her Man" was previously recorded by Waylon Jennings on his 1990 album The Eagle, and "Living in a House Full of Love" was previously a number 3 hit for David Houston back in 1965. In addition, "Wine Me Up" is a cover of Faron Young's hit single. The picture of his album cover just shows him laying on a couch. With his feet one foot behind the other. And holding his hat up in the air with his right hand. When Gary was on TNN Mark Chesnutt was interviewing him he told Mark "It wasn't enough make-up for me to be on the cover."

Track listing

Charts

Certifications

Personnel
Gary Allan – lead vocals
Dan Dugmore – acoustic guitar, steel guitar
Owen Hale – drums
Jake Kelly – acoustic guitar
Jim Lauderdale – background vocals
B. James Lowry – acoustic guitar
Liana Manis – background vocals
Steve Nathan – keyboards
Michael Rhodes – bass guitar
Brent Rowan – electric guitar
John Wesley Ryles  – background vocals
Hank Singer – fiddle
Curtis Young – background vocals

References

1996 debut albums
Gary Allan albums
Decca Records albums
Albums produced by Byron Hill
Albums produced by Mark Wright (record producer)